The Best of Eric Carmen is a compilation album released by Arista Records in 1988, featuring solo recordings from Cleveland, Ohio singer-songwriter Eric Carmen. Unlike subsequent compilations such as The Definitive Collection, this record omits any hits Carmen had with his group the Raspberries. It also fails to include any songs from his 1984 self-titled album on Geffen Records. Instead, The Best Of Eric Carmen features a mix of successful singles and album tracks pulled from his four solo albums with Arista. Notable hits include "All by Myself" (No. 2, US), "Never Gonna Fall in Love Again" (No. 11, US) and "She Did It" (No. 23, US). Carmen's original recordings of "That's Rock 'n' Roll" and "Hey Deanie" are included since the compositions became major hits as covers by teen idol Shawn Cassidy. Additionally, it features his then-recent comeback hit "Hungry Eyes" (1987, No. 4, US), taken from the Dirty Dancing soundtrack. 

After an initial release on LP (AL-8547) and cassette (AC-8547), the album was reissued with a new catalogue number (ending in 8548) later in the year to include "Make Me Lose Control", his follow-up single to "Hungry Eyes", after it reached number three on the Billboard Hot 100. This expanded version of the album was also released on CD (ARCD-8548).

Track listing
All tracks written and produced by Eric Carmen except where noted.

Note: "Make Me Lose Control" only appears on reissue copies of the compilation (those ending with the catalogue number 8548).

Charts

References 

1988 greatest hits albums
Eric Carmen albums
Arista Records compilation albums